The 2012 Libertarian National Convention, in which delegates of the Libertarian Party (LP) chose the party's nominees for president and vice president in the 2012 general election, was held May 2–6, 2012, in Las Vegas, Nevada, at the Red Rock Resort Spa and Casino. Former Governor of New Mexico Gary Johnson won the presidential nomination on the first ballot. Retired California state court judge Jim Gray won the vice presidential nomination, also on the first ballot. The convention also chose to replace most of the Libertarian National Committee party officers and members-at-large.

The theme of this convention was Liberty Will Win.

Several non-binding advisory primaries were held ahead of the convention as part of the 2012 Libertarian Party presidential primaries.

Host selection
This was the first presidential nominating convention ever held in the Las Vegas Valley. Other cities that bid to host the convention included Dallas, Texas, and San Francisco, California.

Candidates debate
In February 2012, Gary Johnson, Lee Wrights, Bill Still, Carl Person, and Leroy Saunders participated in a debate held by the Libertarian Party of Florida and moderated by LPUSA Chair Mark Hinkle.
The debate participants were selected by convention delegates in a secret ballot, in which a candidate needed to score 10 percent of the vote or higher to be allowed to take part. Libertarian candidates in the debate called for ending government interference in personal, family and business decisions; much lower government spending; deregulation; lower taxes; a currency free of government manipulation; free trade; and a peaceful, non-interventionist foreign policy.

Schedule
The convention covered five days over May 2–6. The business of deciding the national platform and candidates formally began on May 3, and a second candidate debate was held on May 4. On May 5, the party nominated Gary Johnson as its presidential candidate and Jim Gray as vice presidential candidate. On May 6, elections for the Libertarian National Committee concluded.

Candidates for the presidential nomination were required to gather "tokens" from delegates. 53 tokens were required to participate in debates, while 30 were needed to be listed on the ballot.

Convention speakers
Speakers at the convention included:
 Norma Jean Almodovar – Sex worker activist and former LAPD cop, LP candidate for Lieutenant Governor of California
 David Bergland – 1984 LP presidential nominee
 Judge John Buttrick – Superior Court Judge of Maricopa County, Arizona
 Alicia Garcia Clark – National Libertarian National Committee (LNC) leader from 1981 to 1983
 Ed Clark – 1980 LP presidential nominee
 Michael Cloud – Author, Secrets of Libertarian Persuasion, who ran for U.S. Senate in Massachusetts in 2002
 Sharon Harris – President of Advocates for Self-Government
 Carla Howell – Executive Director of the Libertarian Party; 2000 LP nominee for the U.S Senate in Massachusetts, 2002 LP nominee for Governor of Massachusetts
 Manny Klausner – Co-founder of the Reason Foundation, and former editor of Reason magazine
 Nancy Lord – 1992 LP vice-presidential nominee
 Tibor Machan – Professor of philosophy at Auburn University
 Tonie Nathan – 1972 LP vice-presidential nominee, and first woman in U.S. History to receive an electoral vote
 Robert Poole – Co-founder of Reason magazine
 Mary Ruwart – Research scientist and former contender for the Libertarian Party presidential nomination

Presidential candidates

Presidential delegate count

Libertarian National Committee elections
The 2012 Libertarian National Convention saw a two-day election of officers and members-at-large of the Libertarian National Committee officers leading to the defeat of most of the incumbents who were seen as being part of a "top-down faction". The voting for chair saw the first instance where "None of the Above", which was listed as a choice on the party ballot, received more votes than any of the candidates for chair. After a new list of individuals was nominated, Geoff Neale was elected chair. R. Lee Wrights was elected Vice Chair, Ruth Bennett Secretary, and Tim Hagan Treasurer. Elected as national committee members-at-large were Bill Redpath, Michael Cloud, Arvin Vohra, and Wayne Allyn Root.

See also
 Gary Johnson 2012 presidential campaign
 Libertarian National Convention
 Other parties' presidential nominating conventions of 2012:
 Democratic
 Green
 Republican
 Libertarian Party of Nevada
 2012 United States presidential election

References

External links
 Official Website of Libertarian National 2012 Convention

Libertarian Party (United States) National Conventions
Libertarian
Gary Johnson
Libertarian National Convention
Political conventions in Nevada
Events in Las Vegas
2012 conferences
May 2012 events in the United States